The 2009 K League was the 27th season of the K League. It was held from 7 March to 6 December 2009, and a total of 15 teams contested, including newly formed Gangwon FC.

Teams

General information

Managerial changes

Regular season

League table

Positions by matchday

Results

Championship playoffs

Bracket

Final table

Top scorers
This list includes goals of the championship playoffs. The official top goalscorer was decided with records of only regular season, and Lee Dong-gook won the award with 20 goals.

Awards

Main awards
The K League Players' Player of the Year was published by Korean edition of FourFourTwo in summer, and was not an official award of the K League, but 143 players participated in the selection process.

Best XI

Source:

Attendance
{| class="wikitable sortable" style="text-align: center"
! Team
! Stadium
! Matches
! Highest
! Lowest
! Average
|-
| align=left|Suwon Samsung Bluewings || align=left|Big Bird Stadium 
| 14 || 35,058 || 10,206 || 18,583
|-
| align=left|FC Seoul || align=left|Seoul World Cup Stadium 
| 14 || 36,764 || 7,685 || 16,779
|-
| rowspan="2" align=left|Gangwon FC || align=left|Gangneung Stadium
| 10 
| rowspan="2"|21,316 
| rowspan="2"|5,129 
| rowspan="2"|14,787
|-
| align="left"|Chuncheon Stadium
| 4
|-
| align=left|Jeonbuk Hyundai Motors || align=left|Jeonju World Cup Stadium 
| 14 || 21,516 || 10,756 || 14,227
|-
| rowspan="2" align=left|Jeonnam Dragons || align=left|Gwang-Yang Stadium
| 13
| rowspan="2"|19,800 
| rowspan="2"|10,420 
| rowspan="2"|13,263
|-
| align="left"|Suncheon Stadium
| 1
|-
| rowspan="5" align=left|Gyeongnam FC || align=left|Changwon Civil Stadium
| 10
| rowspan="5"|21,947 
| rowspan="5"|5,764 
| rowspan="5"|12,269
|-
| align="left"|Masan Stadium
| 1
|-
| align="left"|Miryang Stadium
| 1
|-
| align="left"|Geochang Stadium
| 1
|-
| align="left"|Yangsan Stadium
| 1
|-
| align=left|Pohang Steelers || align=left|Pohang Steelyard 
| 14 || 16,382 || 7,348 || 11,041
|-
| align=left|Incheon United || align=left|Incheon World Cup Stadium 
| 14 || 34,275 || 2,315 || 10,499
|-
| align=left|Ulsan Hyundai || align=left|Ulsan Munsu Stadium 
| 14 || 13,761 || 3,864 || 9,188
|-
| align=left|Daejeon Citizen || align=left|Daejeon World Cup Stadium 
| 14 || 16,561 || 3,535 || 8,596
|-
| rowspan="2" align=left|Daegu FC || align=left|Daegu Stadium
| 12
| rowspan="2"|32,250 
| rowspan="2"|3,201 
| rowspan="2"|8,541
|-
| align="left"|Daegu Civil Stadium
| 2
|-
| align=left|Seongnam Ilhwa Chunma || align=left|Seongnam Sports Complex 
| 14 || 17,049 || 1,367 || 7,917
|-
| align=left|Jeju United || align=left|Jeju World Cup Stadium 
| 14 || 32,765 || 1,753 || 7,757
|-
| rowspan="2" align=left|Gwangju Sangmu || align=left|Gwangju World Cup Stadium
| 13
| rowspan="2"|25,762 
| rowspan="2"|2,873 
| rowspan="2"|7,719
|-
| align="left"|Yeonggwang Sportium
| 1
|-
| align=left|Busan IPark || align=left|Asiad Main Stadium 
| 14 || 17,577 || 3,998 || 7,221
|-
!colspan=2|Total || 210 || 36,764 || 1,367 || 11,226
|}
Source: K League

See also
2009 in South Korean football
2009 K League Championship
2009 Korean League Cup
2009 Korean FA Cup

References

External links
Official website 
Review at K League 

K League seasons
1
South Korea
South Korea